The Ministry for the Environment (MfE; Māori: Manatū Mō Te Taiao) is the public service department of New Zealand charged with advising the New Zealand Government on policies and issues affecting the environment, in addition to the relevant environmental laws and standards. The Environment Act 1986 is the statute that establishes the Ministry.

Description
Functions assigned by Section 31 of the Environment Act 1986 include advising the Minister for the Environment on all aspects of environmental administration, obtaining and disseminating information, and generally providing advice on environmental matters. Since 1988, the Ministry of the Environment has coordinated New Zealand's interdepartmental policy response to climate change.

The Environmental Protection Authority was set up in 2011 to carry out some of the environmental regulatory functions of the MfE as well as other government departments.

The Ministry for the Environment administer a number of environmental funds:
Waste Minimisation Fund
Environmental Legal Assistance Fund
Contaminated Sites Remediation Fund

It runs the Green Ribbon Awards, which have been given out by the Minister for the Environment since 1990.

The Ministry owns the Environmental Choice New Zealand ecolabel, but it is administered independently by the New Zealand Ecolabelling Trust.

In 1997 the Ministry released New Zealand's first State of the Environment report.  This was followed up in 2008 by a second report titled Environment New Zealand 2007. Chapter 13 of this report was removed before final publication but was leaked to the Green Party. After news media reported the existence of the omitted chapter, the Ministry placed the contents on its website.

Ministers
The Ministry serves two portfolios and four ministers.

List of Ministers for the Environment 
Key

See also 
 Climate change in New Zealand
 Environment Court of New Zealand
 Govt3, a discontinued sustainability programme
 List of environmental laws by country: New Zealand
 Resource Management Act 1991, a major statute for environmental protection

Notes

References

External links 

sustainability.govt.nz

Environment
Environment of New Zealand
Environment
New Zealand
New Zealand